Daniel Gherasim (born 2 November 1964 in București) is a former Romanian professional footballer. His son Mihai Gherasim was also a football goalkeeper.

International career
Daniel Gherasim played two games at international level for Romania, making his debut in a 1998 World Cup qualification match when he came as a substitute and replaced Florin Prunea in the 84th of a 3–0 victory against Lithuania.

Honours
Steaua București
Liga I: 1992–93, 1993–94, 1994–95, 1995–96, 1996–97, 1997–98
Cupa României: 1991–92, 1995–96, 1996–97

References

External links
 Daniel Gherasim's profile - SteauaFC.com (Romanian)

1964 births
Living people
Association football goalkeepers
Footballers from Bucharest
Romanian footballers
Romania international footballers
Liga I players
Liga II players
FCV Farul Constanța players
FC Olt Scornicești players
CS Universitatea Craiova players
Romanian football managers
FC Steaua București assistant managers
CSM Jiul Petroșani managers